The Universal Fighting System (UFS) is a collectible card game designed by Jasco Games. Games of UFS represent a fight between two characters in hand-to-hand combat. Characters are drawn from original properties as well as a number of licensed ones, such as Mega Man, Street Fighter, The King of Fighters XIII and Darkstalkers. The sets are cross-compatible – cards from multiple licenses can be included in the same deck, and characters from different universes may face each other in a match.

Gameplay
Players begin a game of UFS with the character they are fighting as in play. The character determines a player's hand size, starting vitality, and each has unique abilities for a deck to make use of. The main object of the game is to reduce the opponent's vitality to 0.

Unlike most CCGs, UFS does not have monsters, creatures or similar. Damage is dealt by playing attack cards, which the opponent may try to block with using a card from their hand. Each attack has stats for speed (how hard it is to block), the damage it will deal, and a zone (high, mid or low) that the opponent's block must match to avoid taking damage. Attacks often have abilities on them, and may be enhanced by abilities on other cards. 

Also unlike other CCGs, the cost to play a card in UFS is not a set number of some resource. To play a card in UFS, players must pass a "control check". A player discards the top card of their deck, and compares its control value (in the lower right) to the difficulty of the card he or she is trying to play. If the control is equal to or above the difficulty needed, the card is played at no cost. If the control is lower, the player must "commit" (turn sideways) foundation cards equal to the difference, or else the attempt to play a card fails and the card is discarded.

Attempted cards get +1 difficulty for each card before it, and the turn player may continue trying to play cards until one of them fails, ending the turn. So the effective "cost" of a card can vary from zero to several resources, depending on its base difficulty, when it is played, and the value of the control check (which is not known until the card is attempted).

Players draw up to their character's hand size at the start of each turn, and with most cards being low in effective cost early in a turn, a typical turn of UFS involves around 3 to 5 cards played by the turn player, plus any blocks or other defensive cards played by the opponent if they are attacked. 

Due to the large number of cards drawn and played, (nearly all of which have an ability or two) the risk-reward nature of the control check system, and the importance of guessing at and playing around the opponent's hand, UFS is generally considered to be one of the more complex and skill-intensive CCGs currently active.

Deck construction
UFS has multiple formats, but most events are standard. Draft and sealed is used for release events, side events, or local change of pace, and there is also a smaller constructed format called Turbo.

A standard UFS deck consists of a minimum of 60 cards (including the character), and no more than four copies of a given card may be in a deck. Due to the large number of cards drawn during a typical game, it is common for decks to exceed the 60 card minimum in order to increase the variety of cards available. For turbo, a deck consists of exactly 41 cards (including the character) with the same restrictions of no more than four copies of a given card. In draft and sealed, players build decks out of random booster packs they either draft, or are given respectively. Draft and sealed decks are also a minimum of 41 cards, but any number of copies of cards may be used. 

Deck building in UFS is driven by the resource symbol system. Each card has 3 symbols on it, representing various elements or concepts. Cards can only be played if they share a symbol with the character, and only if that symbol is on all prior cards played that turn. Therefore, it is normal when building a deck to choose one symbol on the character, and include in the deck only cards that have that symbol.

Card types
There are five different card types in UFS, indicated by the color of their border and other traits:

 Characters – A card representing the combatant a player is fighting as. This is the centerpiece of a deck.
 Attacks – Attacks have an orange border. They represent punches, kicks, weapon strikes, and other moves used to deal damage to the opponent.
 Foundations – Foundations have a grey border. They represent a character's training and background, and are the primary resource used to help pass control checks to play cards.
 Assets – Assets have a green border. They represent locations or objects, and provide abilities more powerful than those on foundations.
 Actions – Actions have a blue border. They represent various maneuvers and have immediate effects when played, allowing a player to use abilities that were kept secret in their hand.

External links

 Jasco Games home page

Card games introduced in 2006
Collectible card games